Diasellaki is a village of the Deskati municipality. The 2011 census recorded 2 inhabitants in the village. Diasellaki is a part of the community of Deskati.

See also
 List of settlements in the Grevena regional unit

References

Populated places in Grevena (regional unit)